Blake Thompson (born 4 July 1993) is an Australian professional footballer. He is currently signed to NSW Premier League club, Mount Druitt Town Rangers FC

Club career 
In 2012, Thompson moved from Queensland, where he had been playing with Brisbane Wolves, to England in the hopes of finding a club. He signed a contract with Birmingham City later in the year.

Thompson signed for Dordrecht in the Dutch Eerste Divisie in July 2016. He moved to England and signed for Enfield Town in the Isthmian League Premier Division in February 2017.

On 24 March 2017 Hednesford Town confirmed on their website, that they had signed with Thompson. In July 2018, Thompson would be released from the club after his contract ended.

References

External links 
 

1993 births
Living people
Australian soccer players
Association football defenders
Eerste Divisie players
FC Dordrecht players
Enfield Town F.C. players
Australian expatriate sportspeople in the Netherlands
Expatriate footballers in the Netherlands
Australian expatriate soccer players